In the Hebrew Bible, Oholiab ( ʾĀholīʾāḇ, "father's tent"), son of Ahisamakh, of the tribe of Dan, worked under Bezalel as the deputy architect of the Tabernacle and the implements which it housed, including the Ark of the Covenant. He is described in Exodus 38:23 as a master of carpentry, weaving, and embroidery.

References 

Book of Exodus people
Tribe of Dan
Ark of the Covenant
Carpenters
Weavers
Embroiderers